Elspeth Thexton Eric (September 15, 1907 – June 15, 1993) was an American actress in old-time radio, "usually cast as the other woman in soaps and serials".

Early years
The daughter of a doctor, Elspeth Thexton Eric was born in Chicago, Illinois. She attended Bradford Academy and graduated from Wellesley College with a double major in economics and English literature. After hearing tales of woe about "girls who had tried to crash the great White Way and failed ... she enrolled in a business school and left word with her friends in New York to let her know when a job was to be had there." 

She garnered some acting experience in summer stock theatre and moved back to New York, where she worked at various jobs for five years while she tried to find work as an actor. During those years, "She was a switchboard operator, waitress, governess, hostess in a cocktail lounge, publicity writer, model, cook, parlor maid, social secretary to a social secretary, stenographer and book saleswoman."

Radio
Eric's initial work on radio came in Big Sister and Aunt Jenny's Real Life Stories. Her roles on radio programs included those shown in the table below.

Other programs on which Eric appeared included The Haunting Hour, The FBI in Peace and War, Abbott Mysteries, Ever Since Eve, Front Page Farrell, Quick as a Flash, Rosemary, Mommie and the Men, Inner Sanctum Mystery, Bulldog Drummond, Manhattan at Midnight, Green Valley, U.S.A., Gang Busters, 21st Precinct, Grand Central Station, and Mr. District Attorney.

Stage
Eric gained early acting experience with the Woodstock Summer Theatre. In 1932, she acted in the troupe at the Westchester Playhouse at Mount Kisco, New York.

Her Broadway credits include The Live Wire, Snafu, Margin for Error, Too Many Heroes, and Dead End.

Television
Eric had the role of Lil Monte in the Road of Life soap opera, which was broadcast on TV and radio in 1955, with the same cast. She also appeared in "His Name Was Death," an episode of Robert Montgomery Presents (March 18, 1957),  "Young Man Adam," an episode of Studio One (December 29, 1952), and "The Unfraid," an episode of The Web (November 23, 1952).

In a 1955 newspaper article, Eric indicated her preference for working in radio. "There are no ulcers in radio," she said. The reporter noted, "She reports her eight radio shows a week are easier than one a week on TV, and leave her more time to herself."

Later years
In the late 1970s, Eric wrote several scripts for CBS Radio Mystery Theater and The General Mills Radio Adventure Theater. One of her scripts, "The Black Room," was published (in "novelized" form) in a book, along with two other stories from CBSRMT. Strange Tales From CBS Radio Mystery Theater was published in 1976 by Popular Library.

Death
Elspeth Eric died of cancer in Manhattan in 1993, aged 85.

References

External links 
 Cover, back cover, and title page of "Strange tales from CBS Radio mystery theater", accessed November 14, 2021. 

1907 births
1993 deaths
American radio actresses
American stage actresses
American television actresses
20th-century American actresses
Wellesley College alumni
Deaths from cancer in New York (state)
American radio writers
Women radio writers